Heart to Heart is a 1962 television play. It was written by Terence Rattigan, directed by Alvin Rakoff and starred Kenneth More.

It was the first production for The Largest Theatre in the World project. This involved a number of countries producing their own version of a television play which would be shown simultaneously.

Premise
A television personality, David Mann, interviews a politician.

Cast
Kenneth More as David Mann
Ralph Richardson as Sir Stanley Johnson
Angela Baddeley as Miss Knott
Wendy Craig as Jessie Weston
Derek Francis as Sir John Dawson-Brown
Jack Gwillim as Controller of Programmes
Megs Jenkins as Lady Johnson
Jean Marsh as Peggy Mann

Production
The script was commissioned from Rattigan. It was based on a show like Face to Face with John Freeman.

Reception
Critical response to the production was excellent.

According to Peter Sallis, who was in the cast "The play went out and I don't think it was ever repeated. Whether the citizens of each country appreciated the fact that it was being shown in a different language next door at the same time I don't know. The effect it had on the history of television I would think was probably very slight, but it didn't do Terence Rattigan any harm."

References

External links
Heart to Heart at IMDB
Heart to Heart at Letterbox DVD
Heart to Heart at BFI
English-language television shows
Black-and-white British television shows